LOSP may refer to:

Lake Ontario State Parkway
Liero Open Source Project
Legion of Super-Pets